Volčje is a village in the hills north of Brežice in the Municipality of Brežice in eastern Slovenia. The area is part of the traditional region of Styria. It is now included with the rest of the municipality in the Lower Sava Statistical Region.

History
On 1 July 1936 the boundary at the southern end of Volčje was redrawn, and the village lost 7 houses (28 people) to the adjoining village of Artiče.

Church
There is a small church dedicated to Saint John of Nepomuk.

References

External links
Volčje on Geopedia

Populated places in the Municipality of Brežice